Open water swimming is a swimming discipline which takes place in outdoor bodies of water such as open oceans, lakes, and rivers.

The beginning of the modern age of open water swimming is sometimes taken to be May 3, 1810, when Lord Byron swam several miles to cross the Hellespont (now known as the Dardanelles) from Europe to Asia.

In the first edition of the modern Olympic Games in Athens in 1896, the swimming competition was held in open water. In 2000, the Olympic Games first included a triathlon with a 1500 m swim leg, and in 2008, a 10 km open water swim. The FINA World Aquatics Championships has featured open water swimming events since 1992. The FINA World Open Water Swimming Championships was held from 2000 to 2010. Since 2007, the FINA 10 km Marathon Swimming World Cup is held in several events around the world.

The activity has grown in popularity in recent years with the publication of bestselling books on "wild swimming" by authors such as Kate Rew and Daniel Start, and Waterlog by Roger Deakin. Popular media coverage of "The Great British Swim," Ross Edgley's swim around mainland Great Britain, brought renewed attention to the activity.

Events such as the Midmar Mile in South Africa (attributed to Wayne Ridden), Great Swim in the UK (attributed to Great Swim with idea by Colin Hill), and the Batley race, have helped create and grow interest in participation of the sport.

Racing techniques

Stroke 
Though most open water races do not require a specific stroke, most competitors employ the front crawl, also known as freestyle.  The efficiency of this stroke was demonstrated by Gertrude Ederle, who, as the first woman to swim the English Channel, employed it to beat the existing world record by more than 2 hours.

Sighting 
When covering large distances, swimmers may head off course due to current, waves, wind, and poor visibility. Typically, buoys are stationed periodically across a large expanse to provide guidance. However, buoys are often invisible due to interference from choppy water and reduced visibility through goggles.  Swimmers are encouraged to 'triangulate' by looking for two aligned, easily visible objects on land that are directly behind the destination (such as the end of a pier as it lines up with a hilltop), and to make sure they continue to appear aligned during the race.

Drafting 
Drafting, which is prohibited by some race regulations, is the technique of following another swimmer so closely that water resistance is reduced. When swimming closely alongside or behind a swimmer in the lead swimmer's wake, resistance is reduced and the amount of effort to swim at the same speed is correspondingly reduced. In calmer conditions, or when facing surface chop, swimmers can also significantly benefit from swimming immediately behind or closely alongside a swimmer of comparable or faster speed.  Not all race organizers permit drafting, and swimmers can run the risk of disqualification if they are caught.

Beach starting/exiting 
When entering the water, swimmers can use techniques to take advantage of the shallow water.  One such technique is walking along the bottom.  Another technique is "dolphining", which involves diving down to the bottom and launching oneself upwards and forwards.  This technique can also help to avoid incoming waves.  When exiting the water, swimmers can body surf to take advantage of waves.

Equipment used in competitions 

The equipment allowed in a race depends on the sanctioning body and/or the race organizers.  For example, races may have divisions for wetsuits and/or relays; may require escort boats / kayakers / paddleboards; and may require specifically colored swim caps.  Some swimmers tend to keep it simple, using a basic swimsuit, goggles, and swim cap.  Many records are based on that attire, which is known as 'channel attire' because it is stipulated in the rules for English Channel crossings and the rules for other long swims. Swimmers often utilize changing robes to dry off and change into or out of their swimwear attire in often cold and public places.

Wetsuit usage 

The ITU rule is that wetsuits are allowed for elite triathlons at below  if  or more, and below  if shorter. Wetsuits are mandatory in triathlons below  if  or more.

Various types of wetsuits of varying thicknesses are used in open water swimming. Some employ high-tech materials and workmanship, others are of basic materials found in surfing and diving wetsuits. Some designs cover the torso, arms and legs, while other designs leave the arms and shoulders exposed.

When a person floats motionless in the water, their legs tend to sink.  When a person swims freestyle, the legs rise toward surface because water passing underneath the body pushes the legs up, similar to how the wind can lift a kite into the air.  In addition, a proper kicking technique will bring the legs all the way to the surface, creating a more streamlined profile for the arms to pull through the water. Both of these mechanisms of becoming horizontal require a small amount of energy from the swimmer.  When a person wearing a thick wetsuit floats motionless in the water, their legs tend to float on the surface.  Theoretically, this obviates the small energy expenditure mentioned above, although an additional small amount of energy is required to continually flex the wetsuit during swimming motions.

High-end triathlon wetsuits have extra flexibility that provides easier range of motion than a surfing or diving wetsuit.  Some triathlon wetsuits have varied thickness by way of panels that provide custom flotation that aids the wearer in keeping an efficient position in the water.

Subcategories 
 Ice swimming
 Long distance swimming
 Marathon swimming
 Winter swimming

Competitions 
 Circuito Gran Fondo Italia, (Italy)
 St Lucia Channel Swim -  swim from St Lucia to Martinique
 Barbados Open Water Festival (Barbados, Carlisle Bay)
 Bosphorus Intercontinental Swim, (Turkey, Istanbul)
 Byron Bay Ocean Swim Classic (Australia, Byron Bay, New South Wales)
 Henley Swim Series (United Kingdom, Henley-on-Thames)
 Pier to Pub (Australia, Victoria, Lorne)
 Cole Classic word's largest ocean swim (Australia, Manly)
 Lake Zurich Swim (Switzerland, Lake Zurich)
 Gozo to Malta Open water race, one of the most scenic open water races in the Mediterranean, (Malta)
 Rottnest Channel Swim (Australia)
 Cadiz Freedom Swim (South Africa)
 Meis–Kaş Swim, in the Mediterranean Sea between Greece and Turkey
 Round the Castle Swim in the canals of downtown (Denmark, Copenhagen)
 Vansbrosimningen 7800 participants (Sweden, Vansbro)
 Whitehaven Beach Ocean Swim (Australia Whitsunday)
 RCP Tiburon Mile (USA, San Francisco Bay)
 The Great Swim Series (United Kingdom, Windermere)
 Water Warrior Amphibious Assault - One Mile Ocean Swim out of Del Mar Beach, Marine Corps Base Camp Pendleton, California (United States)
 Swim Miami (United States, Miami)
 Santa Fe-Coronda Marathon (Argentina, Santa Fe)
 Oceanman series (Europe and global)
 X-Waters series (Russia and Europe)
 TYR Swimcup series (Russia)

Open water swimming is an Olympic-sanctioned discipline. It has been included in the Olympic Games since 2008, and the FINA World Aquatics Championships since 1991.

See also 
 Cole Classic
 List of successful English Channel swimmers
 Lucky's Lake Swim
 Roger Deakin
 Triathlon

References

Further reading

External links 
 

 
Swimming
Aquatics